Andre Nathaniel President (born June 16, 1971) is a former American football tight end who played one season in the National Football League with the New England Patriots and Chicago Bears. He first enrolled at Lamar Community College before transferring to Angelo State University. He attended Everman Joe C. Bean High School in Everman, Texas.

References

External links
Just Sports Stats

Living people
1971 births
Players of American football from Texas
American football tight ends
Lamar Runnin' Lopes football players
Angelo State Rams football players
New England Patriots players
Chicago Bears players
People from Temple, Texas